The Old Feather Store (1680–1860) was a shop located at Dock Square and North Street (formerly Ann Street) in Boston, Massachusetts, in the 17th–19th centuries. It was also called the Old Cocked Hat. Built in 1680 by Thomas Stanbury, it was demolished in 1860.

Brief history
Through the years the building had several successive owners and was used for varying commercial purposes. William Antram made hats, c. 1708. John Greenleaf ran an apothecary, 1766–1778. Samuel Wallis sold goods from West India, c. 1789. Samuel Richards sold hardware, c. 1789, as did Jonathan Phillips, c. 1803. Beginning in 1806, Daniel Pomeroy, John K. Simpson, Daniel P. Simpson, and William B. Simpson sold feathers. Charles Lovejoy sold clothes, c. 1806. William Tileston conducted business in the indigo trade, c. 1809.

Its timber-frame architecture featured multi-level gables, and facades embedded with glass. A contemporary observer described its appearance in the mid-19th century, prior to its demolition:
The outside of the building was covered with a strong, and, as time has proved, durable cement, in which was observable coarse gravel and broken glass, the latter consisting of fragments of dark-colored junk bottles. At the upper part of the principle gable on the Dock square front the date of the time of erecting the building, 1680, was distinctly impressed into the rough-cast cement in Arabic figures, together with various ornamental devices.

References

Further reading
 Edward Griffin Porter. Rambles in old Boston, New England. Cupples, Upham and company, 1887.
 Abbott Lowell Cummings. The Old Feather Store in Boston. Old-time New England v.48, 1958.
 Old Boston in early photographs, 1850–1918: 174 prints from the collection of the Bostonian Society. Courier Dover Publications, 1990.
 D. Brenton Simons. Boston Beheld: Antique Town and Country Views. UPNE, 2008.

External links

 
 New York Public Library. Items related to Old Feather Store.

Images

Demolished buildings and structures in Boston
Buildings and structures completed in 1680
Economic history of Boston
Government Center, Boston
1680 establishments in Massachusetts
Buildings and structures demolished in 1860